Dominique Pifarély (born 1957) is a French jazz violinist. He works in avant-garde jazz, but he has also worked in post-bop and other contexts.

Career 
Pifarély was born in Bègles. In 1979, he began touring with bassist Didier Levallet and guitarist Gérard Marais as a trio. In the 1980s he began leading his own bands, as can be heard on the recording Insula Dulcamara (1988) and Oblique (1992).

In 1985, Pifarély started to work with reedist Louis Sclavis and in 1992, they formed the Sclavis/Pifarély Acoustic Quartet, featuring guitarist Marc Ducret and double bassist Bruno Chevillon, and recorded for ECM. In the late 1990s, he started a duo work with pianist François Couturier, and they recorded an album (Poros, ECM, 1997).

Impromptu is a collaboration with François Couturier, Dominique Visse, and a work on contemporary poetry. He also initiated text/music experiences with French writer François Bon and actors Violaine Schwartz and Pierre Baux. The Dédales ensemble is an acoustic nine piece band. In 2007 he founded a trio with keyboard player Julien Padovani and drummer Eric Groleau.

He performs in Europe and has toured in the U.S., Canada, Japan, India, Middle East, Latin America, and Africa.

Discography

As leader
 Acoustic Quartet with Lous Sclavis (ECM, 1994)
 Triplicity with Stefano Battaglia and Paolino dalla Porta (Dischi Della Quercia, 1995)
 Poros with François Couturier (ECM, 1998)
 Time Before and Time After (ECM, 2015)

As sideman 
With Tim Berne
 Insomnia (Clean Feed)

With Safy Boutella
 Mejnoun (Indigo)

With Jean-Paul Celea and François Couturier
 Black Moon, quartet with François Laizeau (Blue Silver)

With Vincent Courtois
 Pleine lune (Nocturne)
 The Fitting Room, trio with Marc Ducret (Enja)

With Marc Ducret
 Qui parle? (Sketch)
 Tower, Vol. 2 (Ayler)

With Rabih Abou-Khalil
Yara (Enja, 1998)
 Yara, with Nabil Khayat and Vincent Courtois (Enja)

With Didier Levallet 
 Paris-suite (Evidence)
 Eurydice (Evidence)

With Eddy Louiss
 Sang mêlé (Nocturne)
 Multicolor Feeling (Nocturne)

With Michele Rabbia and Stefano Battaglia
 Atem, with Michel Godard, Vincent Courtois (Splash)
 Raccolto (ECM 1933/34)
With Samo Salamon
 Stretching Out (Samo Records, 2013)

With Louis Sclavis
 Chine (IDA, 1987 reissued on Label Bleu)
 Chamber Music (IDA, 1989 reissued on Label Bleu)
 Ellington on the Air (IDA, 1992)
 Rouge (ECM, 1992)
 Les violences de Rameau (ECM, 1996)
 Danses et autres scènes (Label Bleu, 1997)
 Dans la nuit (ECM, 2002)

With Mike Westbrook
 On Duke's Birthday (Hat ART, 1985)
 The Orchestra of Smith's Academy (Enja)

References

External links

Dominique Pifarély Out of joint on YouTube

1957 births
Living people
People from Gironde
French jazz violinists
20th-century French male violinists
21st-century French male violinists
French male jazz musicians
Vienna Art Orchestra members